Howard Bayles (April 6, 1877 – May 20, 1940) was an American sports shooter. He competed in two events at the 1920 Summer Olympics.

References

External links
 

1877 births
1940 deaths
American male sport shooters
Olympic shooters of the United States
Shooters at the 1920 Summer Olympics
People from Port Jefferson, New York
Sportspeople from New York (state)